Vojkovići is a part of the City of Istočno Sarajevo in Istočna Ilidža Municipality, Republika Srpska, Bosnia and Herzegovina.

Sports
Local football club Famos have played 8 seasons at Bosnia and Herzegovina's second level and play their home games at the Stadion u centru Vojkovića.

References

Istočno Sarajevo
Populated places in Istočna Ilidža